Cyril Vincent Walter  (4 December 1912 – 23 March 1988) was a New Zealand hockey player and coach, sports writer, teacher, bookseller. He was born in Nelson, New Zealand, in 1912. He also played in two first-class matches for Canterbury in 1945/46.

In the 1987 Queen's Birthday Honours, Walter was awarded the Queen's Service Medal for community service.

References

1912 births
1988 deaths
New Zealand male field hockey players
New Zealand field hockey coaches
New Zealand booksellers
New Zealand schoolteachers
Recipients of the Queen's Service Medal
New Zealand cricketers
Canterbury cricketers